The Thoroughbred Club of America Stakes is a Grade II American Thoroughbred horse race for fillies and mares aged three-years-old and older over a distance of six furlongs on the dirt held annually in early October at Keeneland Race Course, Lexington, Kentucky during the fall meeting.

History

Originally raced as the TCA Dinner Purse from 1941 through 1980, the Thoroughbred Owners and Breeders Association Graded Stakes Committee elevated it to a stakes race and held on 15 April 1981, during the spring meeting as the Thoroughbred Club Dinner Stakes. In 1983 the event was renamed to the current Thoroughbred Club of America Stakes. 

From 1981 through 1985 the event was restricted to horses whose owner was a member of the club. Dropping that restriction allowed the race to qualify for Graded stakes consideration which it achieved in 1988.

The event was classified Grade III from 1988 through 2008. 

In 1995 the event was scheduled in the fall meeting and continues today to be held then.

The event was run on Polytrack synthetic dirt between 2006 and 2013.

Owned by David & Jill Heerensperger and trained by Greg Gilchrist, Indyanne came into the 2008 race as a favorite, having won the Azalea Stakes at Calder Race Course by  lengths before finishing second in the Victory Ride Stakes at Saratoga. With the lead in the Thoroughbred Club of America Stakes coming down the stretch, Indyanne was hard pressed to hold off Wild Gams, Everrett Novak's very fast filly and winner of the 2007 TCA race. Indyanne held on to win by a head in a new stakes record time which still stands.

In 2009 the event was upgraded by the American Graded Stakes Committee to Grade II status.

The Thoroughbred Club of America Stakes is part of the Breeders' Cup Challenge "Win and You're In" program which gives the annual winner entry into the Filly and Mare Sprint.

Records

Speed record:
 6 furlongs – 1:08.50 Indyanne (2008)

Margins:
  lengths – Cat Cay (2001)

Most wins:
 2 – Excitable Lady (1982, 1983)

Most wins by an owner:
 2 –  Tom Gentry  (1982, 1983)
 2 – Frances A. Genter Stable (1988, 1993)
 2 – Overbrook Farm (1995, 2000)
 2 – William S. Farish III (2005, 2016)

Most wins by a jockey:
 5 – Pat Day (1983, 1993, 1996, 1997, 2001)

Most wins by a trainer:
 2 – C. R. McGaughey III (1985, 2001)
 2 – D. Wayne Lukas (1995, 2000)
 2 –  Larry Robideaux Jr.  (1999, 2002)
 2 – Wesley A. Ward (2011, 2013)
 2 – W. Bret Calhoun (2010,2017)
 2 – Florent Geroux (2018,2022)

Winners

Legend:

 
 

Notes:

† In the 1999 running the 3/5 odds on favorite Bourbon Belle lugged in the final  furlong of the event and interfered with Cinemine who finished second. Stewards disqualified Bourbon Belle and was placed second and Cinemine was declared the winner.

‡ In the 1987 running Zigbelle finished first but was disqualified and placed fourth for bumping the fourth place finisher Ten Thousand Stars on the turn. There Are Rainbows was declared the winner, Weekend Delight was placed second and Ten Thousand Stars placed third.

See also 
 List of American and Canadian Graded races

External links 
 2021 Keeneland Media Guide

References

Graded stakes races in the United States
Grade 2 stakes races in the United States
Sprint category horse races for fillies and mares
Keeneland horse races
Recurring sporting events established in 1981
1981 establishments in Kentucky
Breeders' Cup Challenge series